List of plant species in the genus Zephyranthes.

List 

, Plants of the World Online accepted the following species. Only some selected synonyms are given.

Zephyranthes advena (Ker Gawl.) Nic.García
Zephyranthes alba Flagg, G.Lom.Sm. & García-Mend.
Zephyranthes albiella Traub
Zephyranthes albolilacina Cárdenas
Zephyranthes amambaica (Ravenna) Nic.García & Meerow
Zephyranthes americana (Hoffmanns.) Ravenna (syn. Zephyranthes pusilla (Herb.) D.Dietr.)
Zephyranthes amoena Ravenna
Zephyranthes ananuca (Phil.) Nic.García
Zephyranthes andalgalensis (Ravenna) S.C.Arroyo
Zephyranthes andina (R.E.Fr.) Traub (syns. Zephyranthes challensis Ravenna, Zephyranthes parvula Killip)
Zephyranthes araguaiensis (Ravenna) R.S.Oliveira & Dutilh
Zephyranthes araucana (Phil.) Nic.García
Zephyranthes arenicola Brandegee
Zephyranthes atamasca (L.) Herb. (orth. var. Z. atamasco)
Zephyranthes aurata (Ravenna) Nic.García & Meerow
Zephyranthes bagnoldii (Herb.) Nic.García
Zephyranthes bahiensis (Ravenna) R.S.Oliveira & Dutilh
Zephyranthes bakeri (Phil.) ined.
Zephyranthes barrosiana (Hunz. & Di Fulvio) S.C.Arroyo
Zephyranthes bella T.M.Howard & S.Ogden
Zephyranthes berteroana (Phil.) Nic.García
Zephyranthes bifida (Herb.) Nic.García & Meerow
Zephyranthes bifolia (Aubl.) M.Roem.
Zephyranthes blumenavia (K.Koch & C.D.Bouché ex Carrière) Nic.García & Dutilh
Zephyranthes botumirimensis (R.S.Oliveira) R.S.Oliveira & Dutilh
Zephyranthes brachyandra (Baker) Backer
Zephyranthes brevipes Standl.
Zephyranthes breviscapa Ravenna
Zephyranthes briquetii J.F.Macbr.
Zephyranthes caaguazuensis (Ravenna) Nic.García & Meerow
Zephyranthes caerulea (Griseb.) Baker
Zephyranthes calderensis (Ravenna) Nic.García & S.C.Arroyo
Zephyranthes candida Herb.
Zephyranthes capivarina Ravenna
Zephyranthes cardinalis C.H.Wright
Zephyranthes carinata Herb.
Zephyranthes carminea (Ravenna) S.C.Arroyo
Zephyranthes cearensis (Herb.) Baker
Zephyranthes chacoensis (Ravenna) S.C.Arroyo
Zephyranthes chichimeca T.M.Howard & S.Ogden
Zephyranthes chlorosolen (Herb.) D.Dietr.
Zephyranthes chrysantha Greenm. & C.H.Thomps.
Zephyranthes ciceroana M.M.Mejía & R.G.García
Zephyranthes cisandina (Ravenna) Nic.García
Zephyranthes citrina Baker
Zephyranthes clintiae Traub
Zephyranthes colonum (Phil.) ined.
Zephyranthes comunelloi R.E.Bastian & Büneker
Zephyranthes concinna (Ravenna) R.S.Oliveira & Dutilh
Zephyranthes concolor (Lindl.) G.Nicholson
Zephyranthes consobrina (Phil.) ined.
Zephyranthes contermina (Ravenna) R.S.Oliveira & Dutilh
Zephyranthes conzattii Greenm.
Zephyranthes correntina (Roitman, J.A.Castillo & M.R.Barrios) Nic.García & S.C.Arroyo
Zephyranthes crassibulba (Ravenna) S.C.Arroyo
Zephyranthes crociflora T.M.Howard & S.Ogden
Zephyranthes cubensis Urb.
Zephyranthes datensis (Ravenna) R.S.Oliveira & Dutilh
Zephyranthes depauperata Herb.
Zephyranthes dichromantha T.M.Howard
Zephyranthes diluta Ravenna
Zephyranthes drummondii D.Don – giant rain lily, prairie lily, Hill Country rain lily (US)
Zephyranthes duarteana (Ravenna) R.S.Oliveira & Dutilh
Zephyranthes elegans Ravenna
Zephyranthes elwesii (C.H.Wright) Nic.García
Zephyranthes erubescens S.Watson
Zephyranthes estensis (Ravenna) Nic.García & S.C.Arroyo
Zephyranthes filifolia Herb. ex Kraenzl.
Zephyranthes flavissima Ravenna – yellow rain lily
Zephyranthes fluvialis Ravenna
Zephyranthes fosteri Traub
Zephyranthes gameleirensis (Ravenna) R.S.Oliveira & Dutilh
Zephyranthes gilliesiana (Herb.) Nic.García
Zephyranthes goiana (Ravenna) R.S.Oliveira & Dutilh
Zephyranthes graciliflora (Herb.) Nic.García
Zephyranthes gracilifolia (Herb.) G.Nicholson
Zephyranthes gracilis Herb.
Zephyranthes gratissima Ravenna
Zephyranthes guachipensis (Ravenna) S.C.Arroyo
Zephyranthes guatemalensis L.B.Spencer
Zephyranthes hondurensis Ravenna
Zephyranthes howardii Traub
Zephyranthes immaculata (Traub & Clint) Nic.García & Meerow
Zephyranthes insularum H.H.Hume ex Moldenke
Zephyranthes irwiniana (Ravenna) Nic.García
Zephyranthes ischihualasta (Ravenna) S.C.Arroyo
Zephyranthes ita-andivi García-Mend., Flagg & G.Lom.Sm.
Zephyranthes itaobina (Ravenna) Nic.García
Zephyranthes jamesonii (Baker) Nic.García & S.C.Arroyo
Zephyranthes jonesii (Cory) Traub
Zephyranthes jujuyensis E.Holmb.
Zephyranthes katheriniae L.B.Spencer
Zephyranthes lactea S.Moore
Zephyranthes laeta (Phil.) Nic.García
Zephyranthes lagesiana Ravenna
Zephyranthes lagopaivae (Campos-Rocha & Dutilh) Nic.García & Dutilh
Zephyranthes latissimifolia L.B.Spencer
Zephyranthes leonensis (Ravenna) S.C.Arroyo
Zephyranthes leptandra (Ravenna) Nic.García
Zephyranthes leucantha T.M.Howard
Zephyranthes lindleyana Herb.
Zephyranthes lineata (Phil.) ined.
Zephyranthes longifolia Hemsl.
Zephyranthes longipes Baker
Zephyranthes longistyla Pax
Zephyranthes longituba Flory ex Flagg & G.Lom.Sm.
Zephyranthes lucida (R.S.Oliveira) R.S.Oliveira & Dutilh
Zephyranthes macrosiphon Baker
Zephyranthes maculata (L'Hér.) Nic.García
Zephyranthes magnoi (Ravenna) S.C.Arroyo
Zephyranthes martinezii (Ravenna) Nic.García
Zephyranthes mataca (Ravenna) S.C.Arroyo
Zephyranthes matogrossensis (Ravenna) R.S.Oliveira & Dutilh
Zephyranthes medinae (L.O.Alvarado & García-Mend.) Nic.García & Meerow
Zephyranthes mendocensis Baker
Zephyranthes mesochloa Herb.
Zephyranthes mexicana (T.M.Howard) Nic.García & Meerow
Zephyranthes microcarpa (Rusby) S.C.Arroyo
Zephyranthes microstigma Ravenna
Zephyranthes millarensis (Ravenna) Nic.García
Zephyranthes minima Herb.
Zephyranthes minor (Ravenna) R.S.Oliveira & Dutilh
Zephyranthes minuta (Kunth) D.Dietr. (syn. Zephyranthes verecunda Herb.)
Zephyranthes miradorensis (Kraenzl.) Espejo & López-Ferr.
Zephyranthes moctezumae T.M.Howard
Zephyranthes modesta Ravenna
Zephyranthes moelleri (Phil.) Nic.García
Zephyranthes monantha (Ravenna) Nic.García
Zephyranthes montana (Phil.) Nic.García
Zephyranthes morrisclintii Traub & T.M.Howard – Morris-Clint's rain lily
Zephyranthes nelsonii Greenm.
Zephyranthes nervosa Herb.
Zephyranthes neumannii (Roitman, J.A.Castillo & Maza) Nic.García & S.C.Arroyo
Zephyranthes nymphaea T.M.Howard & S.Ogden
Zephyranthes oranensis (Ravenna) S.C.Arroyo
Zephyranthes orellanae Carnevali, Duno & J.L.Tapia
Zephyranthes pantanalensis (Ravenna) R.S.Oliveira & Dutilh
Zephyranthes paranaensis Ravenna
Zephyranthes pedunculosa (Herb.) Nic.García & S.C.Arroyo
Zephyranthes philadelphica (Ravenna) Nic.García & Meerow
Zephyranthes phycelloides (Herb.) Nic.García
Zephyranthes picta (Ravenna) S.C.Arroyo
Zephyranthes plumieri H.H.Hume ex Moldenke
Zephyranthes popetana (Phil.) ined.
Zephyranthes primulina T.M.Howard & S.Ogden – yellow rain lily (Mexico)
Zephyranthes proctorii Acev.-Rodr. & M.T.Strong
Zephyranthes pseudoconcolor Flagg, G.Lom.Sm. & García-Mend.
Zephyranthes puertoricensis Traub
Zephyranthes pulchella J.G.Sm.
Zephyranthes purpurea Phil.
Zephyranthes purpurella Ravenna
Zephyranthes refugiensis F.B.Jones – Refugio zephyr lily
Zephyranthes reginae T.M.Howard & S.Ogden – Queens rain lily (Mexico)
Zephyranthes riojana (Ravenna) S.C.Arroyo
Zephyranthes robusta (Herb.) Baker
Zephyranthes rosalensis Ravenna
Zephyranthes rosea Lindl. – pink rain lily
Zephyranthes rubra (Ravenna) R.S.Oliveira & Dutilh
Zephyranthes ruizlealii (Ravenna) S.C.Arroyo
Zephyranthes saipinensis (Ravenna) Nic.García
Zephyranthes salinarum (Ravenna) S.C.Arroyo
Zephyranthes saltensis (Ravenna) S.C.Arroyo
Zephyranthes sanavirone (Roitman, J.A.Castillo, G.M.Tourn & Uria) Nic.García & S.C.Arroyo
Zephyranthes schulziana (Ravenna) S.C.Arroyo
Zephyranthes sessilis Herb.
Zephyranthes simpsonii Chapm. – Simpson's lily, Carolina Atamasco lily
Zephyranthes smallii (Alexander) Traub – Small's rain lily
Zephyranthes solisii (Phil.) ined.
Zephyranthes spectabilis (Ravenna) S.C.Arroyo
Zephyranthes splendens (Renjifo) Nic.García
Zephyranthes sprekeliopsis (Christenh. & Byng) Nic.García & Meerow
Zephyranthes stellaris Ravenna
Zephyranthes stellatorosea G.Lom.Sm., Spurrier, Flagg & Espejo
Zephyranthes steyermarkii (Ravenna) S.C.Arroyo
Zephyranthes subflava L.B.Spencer
Zephyranthes susatana Fern.Alonso & Groenend.
Zephyranthes sylvatica (Mart. ex Schult. & Schult.f.) Baker
Zephyranthes tenuiflora (Phil.) Nic.García
Zephyranthes tepicensis (Greenm. ex Flagg & G.Lom.Sm.) Flagg & G.Lom.Sm.
Zephyranthes traubii (W.Hayw.) Moldenke – Traub's rain lily, San Carlos rain lily, Mexican rain lily
Zephyranthes treatiae S.Watson
Zephyranthes tubispatha (L'Hér.) Herb.
Zephyranthes tucumanensis Hunz.
Zephyranthes uruguaianica Ravenna
Zephyranthes venturiana (Ravenna) S.C.Arroyo
Zephyranthes versicolor (Herb.) G.Nicholson
Zephyranthes vittata (T.M.Howard) Nic.García & Meerow
Zephyranthes wrightii Baker
Zephyranthes yaviensis Ravenna
Zephyranthes zapotecana Nic.García & Meerow

Some other names are found in the horticultural literature, but  not in scientific databases of plant names, such as the Kew Checklist or the International Plant Names Index. These include: Zephyranthes huastecana, Zephyranthes lancasterae, Zephyranthes sylvestris and Zephyranthes zeyheri. Zephyranthes sulphurea is Z. citrina.

References 

List
Zephyranthes